Herning Airport ( or Herning Lufthavn)  is an airport located  north-northeast of Herning, a city in Herning Municipality (Herning Kommune), Central Denmark Region (Region Midtjylland), Denmark.

Facilities

References

External links
  Herning Motorflyveklub
 

Airports in Denmark
Buildings and structures in the Central Denmark Region
Transport in the Central Denmark Region
Herning Municipality